India Ria Amarteifio (born 17 September 2001) is an English actress. She began her career as a child actress on the West End. She appeared on the 2023 Variety list of 10 Brits to Watch and was named a Bright Young Thing by Tatler.

Early life
Amarteifio was born in Kingston upon Thames and grew up in Twickenham. She joined the Richmond Academy of Dance in 2012, through which she auditioned for and earned a scholarship to attend the Sylvia Young Theatre School.

Career
Amarteifio made her West End debut as young Nala in The Lion King at the Lyceum Theatre in 2011. She then appeared in Matilda the Musical at the Cambridge Theatre as Hortensia. Amarteifio was in the 2013 original cast of Charlie and the Chocolate Factory at the Theatre Royal, Drury Lane in the alternating role of Violet Beauregarde. That same year, she made her television debut in the BBC One film Gangsta Granny.

In 2015, Amarteifio appeared in the miniseries The Interceptor and guest starred in the Doctor Who series 9 episode "The Magician's Apprentice", also on BBC One, and began starring in the Disney Channel series The Evermoor Chronicles (also known as just Evermoor in some countries) as Lacie Fairburn, a role she would play for both series. She went on to have recurring roles as Roz Huntley's (Thandiwe Newton) daughter Sophie in the fourth series of Line of Duty and Maya Roebuck in the third series of the Sky Atlantic and Canal+ crime drama The Tunnel.

Amarteifio made her feature film debut in the 2019 comedy-drama Military Wives. In 2022, she played Nora Randall in the Sky Max science fiction series The Midwich Cuckoos and was cast as a young version of Golda Rosheuvel's titular character in the Netflix period drama prequel Queen Charlotte: A Bridgerton Story, which will premiere in May 2023.

Filmography

Stage

References

External links
 
 India Amarteifio at Hamilton Hodell

Living people
2001 births
Alumni of the Sylvia Young Theatre School
Black British actresses
English child actresses
English musical theatre actresses
English people of Ghanaian descent
People from Twickenham